Minke Bisschops (born 2 September 2002) is a Dutch track and field athlete who competes as a sprinter.

Career
Bisschops represents the Netherlands at international competitions. She ran a personal best time of 11.35 for the 100 metres in the heats of the 2021 European Athletics U20 Championships in Tallinn, Estonia in August 2021. At that championships Bisschops won the silver medal in the 200 metres.

She competed at the 2022 World Athletics Championships in the 4 × 100 metres relay event in Eugene, Oregon. She also competed at the 2022 European Athletics Championships in Munich.

References

External links

2002 births
Dutch female sprinters
Living people
21st-century Dutch women